Think Smart, Be Fearless: A Biography of Bill Gates is a 2019 picture book biography of Bill Gates written by Sharon Mentyka and illustrated by Vivien Mildenberger. The book was first published by Sasquatch Books.

The book has received reviews from publications including Publishers Weekly, School Library Journal, Kirkus Reviews, and GeekDad.

References 

2019 children's books
Cultural depictions of Bill Gates
American biographies
Biographies about businesspeople
Sasquatch Books books